Vijay Kumar Yadav was an Indian politician . He was a Member of Parliament, representing Nalanda, Bihar in the Lok Sabha the lower house of India's Parliament as a member of the Communist Party of India.

References

External links
Official biographical sketch in Parliament of India website

Lok Sabha members from Bihar
Communist Party of India politicians from Bihar
1929 births
Living people